Tyio Simon (born 29 September 1978) is an Antiguan and Barbudan footballer, currently playing for SAP in the Antigua and Barbuda Premier Division.

International career
Simon, not be confused with fellow Antiguan midfielder Troy Simon, made his debut for Antigua and Barbuda in a March 2003 CONCACAF Gold Cup qualification match against Cuba and has earned over 10 caps since. He played in 4 FIFA World Cup qualification games.

National team statistics

International goals
Scores and results list Antigua and Barbuda's goal tally first.

References

External links
 

1978 births
Living people
Antigua and Barbuda footballers
Antigua and Barbuda international footballers
Association football midfielders
SAP F.C. players